A Session with Gary Lewis and the Playboys is the second studio album by American band Gary Lewis & the Playboys, and was released in 1965 on Liberty Records, LRP-3419. It is the second of three charting albums released by the band in 1965, and it was the band's highest charting album reaching number 18 on the Billboard 200. Two singles from this album, "Count Me In" and the Brian Hyland cover "Save Your Heart for Me" both reached number 2 on the Billboard Hot 100.

Background
Following on the success of the single "This Diamond Ring" and their debut album of the same name, Lewis and the band went back into the studio with producer Snuff Garrett and arranger Leon Russell and recorded their second album, A Session with Gary Lewis and the Playboys, which was released fin August 1965. While the album did have several original songs, it, like their debut, mainly relied on covers of recent popular songs by artists as diverse as The Yardbirds, Ricky Nelson, The Everly Brothers, and Freddy Cannon. Riding on this success, Lewis would release his third charting album, Everybody Loves a Clown only three months later.

Track listing
 "Count Me In" (Glen D. Hardin) – 2:20
 "Travelin' Man" (Jerry Fuller) – 2:07
 "Concrete And Clay" (Brian Parker, Tommy Moeller) – 2:25
 "Walk Right Back" (Sonny Curtis) – 2:00
 "For Your Love" (Graham Gouldman) – 2:40
 "Save Your Heart for Me" (Gary Geld, Peter Udell) – 1:54 
 "Palisades Park" (Chuck Barris) – 2:04
 "Without A Word Of Warning" (Gary Lewis, Leon Russell, Tom Lesslie) – 2:05
 "Voodoo Woman" (Bobby Goldsboro) – 2:20
 "Free Like Me" (Hardin) – 2:20
 "Little Miss Go-Go" (Russell, Louis Yule Brown, Lesslie) – 2:21 
 "Runaway" (Del Shannon, Max Crook) – 2:19

Personnel

Gary Lewis and the Playboys
 Gary Lewis – vocals, drums
 Dave Walker – rhythm guitar, vocals
 Dave Costell – lead guitar
 Carl Radle – bass
 John R. West – electric cordovox

These were the Playboys at the time of the recording, although many session musicians were also used.

Technical
 Snuff Garrett – music producer, liner notes
 Leon Russell – arranger
 "Bones" Howe – engineer
 Studio Five – cover design
 Ron Joy – photography

Charts
Album – Billboard (United States)

Singles

References

1965 albums
Gary Lewis & the Playboys albums
Liberty Records albums
Albums produced by Snuff Garrett
Albums arranged by Leon Russell